Lukáš Klein (born 22 March 1998) is a Slovak tennis player. Klein has a career-high ATP singles ranking of World No. 136, achieved on 28 November 2022. He also has a career-high doubles ranking of World No. 240, achieved on 5 April 2021.

Klein has reached 12 career singles finals, with a record of 8 wins and 4 losses, including 2 ATP Challenger titles and the rest on the ITF Futures Tour. Additionally, he has reached 11 career doubles finals, with a record of 5 wins and 6 losses, including a 1–3 result in ATP Challenger finals.

Career

2021: ATP & top 250 & Olympics singles & doubles debut
Klein won the doubles title at the 2021 Challenger La Manche with compatriot Alex Molčan 1–6, 7–5, [10–6].

Klein made his ATP main draw singles debut in March 2021 at the 2021 Argentina Open in Argentina, where he defeated Andrea Collarini, Thiago Seyboth Wild and Ernesto Escobedo to qualify for the main draw. Klein then went on to upset compatriot Andrej Martin in the first round defeating him 7–5, 6–3. He would go on to lose in the second round to top seed, local favourite and eventual champion Diego Schwartzman in straight sets 4–6, 2–6. He reached the top 250 and a career-high of World No. 248 in singles on 28 June 2021 after reaching the second round also as a qualifier at the 2021 Mallorca Championships by defeating 8th seed Dušan Lajović.

At the Olympics, Klein was entered as an alternate for Matteo Berrettini, who had withdrawn due to a thigh injury. He also participated in the doubles event partnering Filip Polášek where they reached the second round.

2022: Maiden Challenger title, Major & top 150 debut
In May, he won his first Challenger at the 2022 Saturn Oil Open in Troisdorf, Germany as a qualifier without dropping a set.

He qualified for the 2022 Wimbledon Championships making his Grand Slam debut. He lost to wildcard Liam Broady in five sets.

He reached his second Challenger final in Alicante and won the title. As a result, he moved more than 40 positions up to a new career-high in the top 180 on 10 October 2022. Following his third final in Ortisei, he moved 17 positions up into the top 150 at No. 146 on 31 October 2022.

ATP Challenger and ITF Futures finals

Singles: 13 (8–5)

Doubles: 11 (5–6)

Junior Grand Slam finals

Doubles: 1 (1 runner-up)

References

External links
 
 
 
 
 

1998 births
Living people
Slovak male tennis players
Sportspeople from Spišská Nová Ves
Tennis players at the 2020 Summer Olympics
Olympic tennis players of Slovakia